Listen Here! is an album by Eddie Palmieri. In 2006, the album won Palmieri the Grammy Award for Best Latin Jazz Album.

Track listing
 "In Flight" (Palmieri) – 5:41
 "Listen Here" (Eddie Harris) – 7:19
 "Vals con Bata" (Palmieri) – 5:15
 "Tema Para Eydie" (Palmieri) – 4:25
 "Tin Tin Deo" (Gil Fuller, Chano Pozo) – 6:21
 "In Walked Bud" (Thelonious Monk) – 5:59
 "La Gitana" (Palmieri) – 7:15
 "Nica's Dream" (Horace Silver) – 5:52
 "Mira Flores" (Palmieri) – 5:49
 "EP Blues" (Palmieri) – 8:18

Personnel 
Eddie Palmieri - piano
Nicholas Payton, Brian Lynch - trumpet
Conrad Herwig, Doug Beavers - trombone
Donald Harrison, Ivan Renta - alto saxophone
Michael Brecker, David Sanchez - tenor saxophone
John Scofield - guitar
Regina Carter - violin
John Benítez, Christian McBride - bass
Horacio "El Negro" Hernández - drums
Giovanni Hidalgo - percussion

References

2005 albums
Eddie Palmieri albums
Concord Records albums
Grammy Award for Best Latin Jazz Album